Adelotremus is a small genus of combtooth blennies which are found in the Indo-Pacific region. The name of the genus is a compound of the Greek Adelos meaning "concealed" and trema meaning "hole", this was coined to reflect that the type of Adelotremus leptus was discovered hiding in a tube made by a polychaete.

Species
There are currently two species recognised in the genus Adelotremus:

 Adelotremus deloachi Smith-Vaniz, 2017 Spotfin fangblenny 
 Adelotremus leptus Smith-Vaniz & Rose, 2012

References

 
Blenniinae
Taxa named by William Farr Smith-Vaniz